John C. Tully is a theoretical chemist, a researcher and Sterling Professor emeritus of Chemistry at Yale University. He is known for his development of surface hopping, a method for including excited states in molecular dynamics calculations. Much of his career was spent at Bell Labs, from 1970-1996, exploring theoretical chemistry and surface science. In 1996, he became a faculty member at Yale University, where he pursued research in physical chemistry and physics. He is a member of the National Academy of Sciences and the International Academy of Quantum Molecular Science. In 2020 he was awarded the NAS Award in Chemical Sciences.

References

External links
 https://web.archive.org/web/20120628094730/http://www.chem.yale.edu/faculty/tully.html
 http://ursula.chem.yale.edu/~tully/

Living people
Year of birth missing (living people)
Yale Sterling Professors